The first USS Arcadia (SP-856) was a motorboat that may have seen brief service as a United States Navy patrol vessel in late 1918.

Arcadia was built as a private wooden motorboat of the same name in 1915 by Frank S. Terry at Brooklyn, New York. In 1917, the U.S. Navy chartered her from her owner for use as a section patrol boat during World War I and took delivery of her on 8 October 1918. No logbooks exist to confirm that she was commissioned as USS Arcadia (SP-856) or to describe the extent and nature of her U.S. Navy service. Given the short period the Navy controlled her and the ending of the war just under five weeks after her acquisition, it is possible that she never was commissioned.

Arcadias final disposition also is murky. One source states that Arcadia was turned over to her owner and stricken from the Navy List on 6 November 1918, while another indicates that a lump sum for the charter of the craft had been determined on 3 February 1919 and that Arcadia had been authorized for return to her owner. It appears that she was returned to her owner by no later than May 1919.

Notes

References

Department of the Navy Naval History and Heritage Command Online Library of Selected Images: Civilian Ships: Arcadia (American Motor Boat, 1915). May have served as USS Arcadia (SP-856) in 1918-1919
NavSource Online: Section Patrol Craft Photo Archive Arcadia (SP 856)

Patrol vessels of the United States Navy
World War I patrol vessels of the United States
Ships built in Brooklyn
1915 ships